The second full-length cd release from Ipswich ska band The Ballistics, released in 2006 on Dental Records.  The title refers to Kelso Cochrane.

Track listing
My Uncle Fred
City In Decay
Slow Down
Spike
Another Zero
Untouchable
Sucked In, Spat Out
The Cairo Practitioner
Easy Way Out
Let Me Down

Personnel
Glenn McCarthy - vocals
Martyn Peck ('Roki') - guitar / vocals
Daz Hewitt - keyboards / vocals
Mike Claydon - bass
Steve Pipe - drums / vocals
Tom Johnson - tenor saxophone
Graeme Cowey - alto saxophone
Mark Schorah - trumpet

More information
All songs written by The Ballistics except Easy Way Out, which was originally written by The Adicts, and The Cairo Practitioner, which was written by Sonia McNulty.

2006 albums
The Ballistics albums